Katharine Charlotte Deirdre Brownlow (born 16 August 1964) is a British rower. She competed in the women's eight event at the 1992 Summer Olympics.

References

External links
 

1964 births
Living people
British female rowers
Olympic rowers of Great Britain
Rowers at the 1992 Summer Olympics
People from Altrincham